The daguangxian (literally "great, broad string [instrument]") is a Chinese bowed two-stringed musical instrument in the huqin family of instruments, held on the lap and played upright. It is used primarily in Taiwan and Fujian, among the Hakka and Min Nan people.

It is also referred to as datongxian, guangxian, and daguanxian.

See also 
 Chinese music
 List of Chinese musical instruments

Huqin family instruments
Chinese musical instruments
Hokkien music